Extinguished: Outtakes is an EP by Prefuse 73. It was released on Warp in 2003. It peaked at number 14 on Billboard Top Dance/Electronic Albums chart.

Critical reception
Ian Mathers of Stylus Magazine gave Extinguished: Outtakes a grade of B, saying, "Although the tracks are uniformly of high quality, there's not a lot of purchase for the listener into the constantly-shifting soundscape, which means that at its best Herren creates true ambient music; easy to ignore, but vastly rewarding if your attention is fully focused."

Track listing

Charts

References

External links
 

2003 EPs
Prefuse 73 albums
Warp (record label) EPs